Mercy Relief is a non-governmental humanitarian organization in Singapore. The organization was officially launched in 2003, by the then-Deputy Prime Minister of Singapore, Mr Lee Hsien Loong, it seeks to promote a life of compassion, care and volunteerism.

As well as responding to immediate disasters in the Asian region, its longer-term developmental projects also focus on water & sanitation, shelter, sustainable livelihoods, healthcare and education.

Mercy Relief responds within 72 hours of a disaster, delivering emergency aid to affected communities. It has executed 84 separate disaster relief operations as well as 65 sustainable developmental programs. A core aspect of Mercy Relief's values is not only in responding to emergencies but also following up their aftermath, hence their 5 core values as seen above.

Over the past decade, Mercy Relief has reached to some 2.2 million beneficiaries in 26 different countries across Asia.

Milestones 
Officially launched in 2003, Mercy Relief is Singapore's only independent non-governmental organization (NGO) involved in humanitarian disaster relief. In December 2003, Mercy Relief was granted the Institution of Public Character (IPC) Status.

The charity's first response since its official launch was to Bohorok River flash floods in North Sumatra in 2003, followed by the earthquake in Bam, Iran in the same year. The next year, Mercy Relief was awarded the annual Singapore International Foundation Award for its efforts in spreading the Singaporean spirit in 11 countries through its works.

Mercy Relief was invited by United Nations in 2008 to speak at the International Disaster and Risk Conference, on "Peace-time strategies that can ease relief operations and the management of risks during and after such calamities".

In 2009, Singapore observed its inaugural World Humanitarian Day, where the works and sacrifices of humanitarians, including Mercy Relief's, was commemorated. It then partnered up with Singapore Polytechnic in 2010 to conduct a two-year diploma-plus certificate course in humanitarian affairs.

Mercy Relief also hosted Singapore's President, President Tony Tan Keng Yam at a humanitarian assistance project site in Magelang, Indonesia in 2012. And in that same year, they participated in Singapore's National Day Parade for the first time, as part of the marching contingent.

International relief work

2020 Southeast Asia Flood & Typhoon 

Mercy Relief responded to the torrential floods and storm surges in Vietnam & the Philippines on 11 November 2020.
Due to the monsoon season, heavy downpours and tropical storms have led to landslides and flash floods, leaving infrastructure wrecked and thousands displaced in Vietnam and the Philippines.  In just over a month, Vietnam was hit with six storms which caused widespread floods and landslides, leaving at least 239 people dead or missing and 1.5 million people directly affected and in need of clean water, food, medical care and shelter. Landfalls in the Philippines caused by Typhoon Goni, the world’s strongest typhoon of 2020, killed at least 67 people and displaced over 408,000 people.

Mercy Relief worked with its ground partners, WARECOD in Vietnam & CDRC Philippines, to provide the emergency relief aid of food packs, clean water, hygiene kits, blankets and tarpaulin to the affected communities of Vietnam and the Philippines.
A total of 1222 relief packs were distributed, benefiting 4472 individuals.

2020 Jakarta Floods 
Intense downpour equivalent to 72,000 Olympic-size swimming pools hit the capital on New Year’s Eve. It triggered landslides and floods that have since claimed 66 lives and displaced 173,000 people across 12 villages, with South and East Jakarta reported to be the most affected.  

Mercy Relief responded to the emergency by providing hot meals and clean water to the affected communities. Hygiene kits and solar lamps were also distributed to ensure that the survivors can keep up with the hygiene requirements. The efforts have since reached 8,286 people in collaboration with Aksi Cepat Tanggap.

2019 Typhoon Phanfone   
Typhoon Phanfone (known locally as Ursula) swept through the Visayas islands, Philippines, on Christmas eve and continued through Christmas day. The disaster destroyed 2,300 villages and affected 1.9 million. An estimated 378,000 houses, 400 schools, and 32 public structures were damaged. The death toll stood at 50 and close to 370 injuries were reported.  

Mercy Relief worked with Southern Tagalog People's Response Center to assist the affected communities and delivered hot meals to them. Food packs were also distributed in 3 areas in Mindoro Oriental and Mindoro, reaching a total of 2,320 beneficiaries in total.

2019 Davao del sur Earthquake 
A 6.9-magnitude earthquake struck Davao del Sur, Mindanao, on 15 December 2019 and affected more than 378,000 people, of which approximately 108,000 of them were survivors of the October earthquakes. The quake saw the destruction of thousands of homes, schools and healthcare facilities, and records 210 injuries and 13 fatalities.  

Mercy Relief worked with Disaster Response Center to conduct needs assessments and delivered hot meals to the affected communities. Non-perishables, water, and plastic sheets were also distributed. A total of 2,066 people was reached.

2019 Typhoon Kammuri   
Typhoon Kammuri (known locally as Tisoy) hit Northern Samar on 3 December 2019 and brought violent winds and intense rainfall to the region. More than 2 million people were affected as the typhoon swept through their village and destroy their boats, the main source of their livelihood.  

Working hand in hand with local partners, Leyte Center for Development and Southern Tagalog People's Response Center, Mercy Relief conducted needs assessments and prepared hot meals for families in evacuation centers in seven 7 communities in the municipality of Mapanas, as well as 6 communities in Palapag, Northern Samar. Basic psychosocial session was also conducted with children. The efforts benefitted 7,184 individuals in total.

2019 Cotabato Earthquake   
Earthquakes ranged between magnitudes of 6.1 to 6.6 struck the Cotabato province of Philippines in October 2019, damaging structures and agricultures. At its peak, over 71,969 families were displaced. Close to 47,500 houses were totally damaged or partially damaged in the disaster.  

Mercy Relief worked with Disaster Response Center and Mindanao Interfaith Services Foundation to conduct needs assessments and deliver hot meals to the affected communities. The effort reached 1,904 in total.

2019 Typhoon Hagibis   
One of the worst natural disasters to hit Japan in a decade, Typhoon Hajibis left Honshu island in destruction when it brought heavy rainfalls that triggered landslides and floods. The unprecedented downpour has submerged many areas in the waters strong wind and saw 7 million people placed on non-compulsory evacuation orders. More than 40,000 houses were flooded, and numerous electric infrastructures were damaged.

For 19 weeks, Mercy Relief and its ground partner, Association for Aid and Relief Japan, gave out hot meals to the communities in Nagano, Fukushima, and Miyagi prefecture. Subsequently, it also funded the repair work of facilities in 2 social welfare centers, and a research project centered on understanding the needs of disabled people in Tokyo. Doing so will help authorities and organizations to gain knowledge of the needs and meet them effectively. A total of 4930 beneficiaries were reached at the end of the mission and post-disaster efforts.

2018 Lombok Earthquake Relief   
A series of earthquakes struck Lombok in July through September, triggering tsunami and liquefaction and landslides altogether. Close to 3000 deaths were reported, and more than 2 million people were displaced for their houses are either destroyed or partially damaged. Numerous infrastructures were severely damaged in the process, including the vital power and water supply.  

Mercy Relief responded to the disaster by distributing food and relief supplies to the survivors. It also partnered with YEU, a local NGO, to deliver medical services to survivors in northern Lombok. Mobile clinic services were set up in Teniga village and Pendua Village. To ensure that the affected communities’ health is kept up, food provisions and supplementary feeding for children under the age of 5 were also provided. Clean water, water reservoirs and water tanks were also distributed to villages and shelters. The total number of beneficiaries in the aforementioned efforts is 1,600 individuals, made possible with the $13,000 public fundraising.

2018 Sulawesi Earthquake Relief   
Sulawesi was struck by a series of earthquakes 28 September 2018, with the strongest one recorded at 7.5 magnitude. Over 2,000 deaths and 5,0000 missing cases were reported. The disaster is reported to affect approximately 1.5 million people and damaged more than 68,000 houses. 

Calls for donation also garnered generous donations from the public, $30,761 on donation platform, Giving.SG, and $360,000 from Singapore’s Muslim community. These funds enabled the survivors to receive more aids to recuperate. A team was deployed to the scene with YAKKUM Emergency Unit, a local NGO, to distribute food packages, water, shelter kits, and LED lamps to the affected communities in Sigi, Palu, and Donggala district. Health services were also provided across 3 camps and a church to treat illnesses or injuries sustained by the locals. The efforts benefited 9,540 survivors in total.

2018 Sunda Strait Tsunami Relief   
A volcano eruption between the islands of Java and Sumatra caused an underground landslide and triggered a tsunami that struck coastal areas —Pandeglang, Serang, South Lampung and Tanggamus— hard. The impact of the tsunami was grave, with death toll amounting to 437, injured persons at 14,059, and more than 36,000 displaced.  

Mercy Relief delved into a 6-day relief mission with Yayason PKPA to provide support to the survivors. Essential items, blankets, hygiene kits, water, and food supplies were distributed to the affected communities. The aid reached 3,569 people in total and was made possible through crowdfunding initiative by MediaCorp and on Giving.Sg.

2018 Kerala Flood Relief   
Kerala experienced an abnormally high rainfall—42% above normal range—between June to mid-August 2018 that result in severe floods. The situation worsened when water from 37 dams were released from their catchment due to the torrential rain. The dire situation reports 433 deaths and saw 1.4 million people displaced.  

A disaster response team was deployed to aid the communities in Kerala. 400 relief kits which include basic food and hygiene items were distributed in the Ernakulam and Alappuzha districts of Kerala and 36 household water wells were restored for local families. The efforts were made possible with Rapid Response and $17,000 relief funds raised from the public.

2018 Japan Flood Relief   
Floods and landslides triggered by heavy downpour destroyed crushed buildings and left numerous prefectures partially submerged in water. The disaster reported 220 deaths and rendered 12 missing. 39,067 houses were reported to be damaged across the 15 affected prefectures.  

Donations garnered enabled Mercy Relief and its ground partner, Association for Aid and Relief Japan, to provide hot meals and fruits for the displaced communities. A total of 10,670 survivors were reached. Healthcare services were also provided on the ground at Mabi Town to care for the vulnerable groups. Subsequently, Mercy Relief supported the operation cost of a community support project for deaf persons at Okayama, Hiroshima and Ehime prefecture, in partnership with chapters of Japanese Federation of the Deaf to better support the community in need. Finally, in partnership with Japan Disability Forum, Mercy Relief also purchased agricultural equipment for 2 social welfare centers in Hiroshima and Ehime to support survivors with disabilities.

2018 Laos Dam Collapse Relief   
On 23 July night, a dam under construction in the Attapeu Province of Laos collapsed and water equivalent to 2 million Olympic-size swimming pools obliterated villages downstream. The disaster reported 71 deaths and destroyed multiple infrastructures. Over 11,000 Laotians were affected, and many are left homeless as mud have washed over their houses, making it unliveable. The aftermath sees livelihood of villagers wiped out as farms, vehicles for transport, and houses were all destroyed.  

Mercy Relief partnered with Shanti Volunteer Association in Laos and deployed its team to Attapeu to distribute 150 family relief kits to families displaced from their villages near the collapsed dam. Cooking utensils and solar lamps were also provided to 1,000 survivors at the evacuation center.

2018 Mount Mayon Relief   
A phreatic eruption at the start of 2018 set Albay in a state of distress after the active volcano started spewing ash and lava on 13 January, emitting Sulphur dioxide gas as it carried out its activities. Fearing violent eruption, many families were evacuated to temporary shelters. At its height, over 90,000 were displaced. The eruption ravaged through March.  

Mercy Relief, together with its ground partners—Disaster Response Center and Tarabang para sa Bicol (TABI)— provided hot meals to the affected communities. Nutritious meals were prepared in various evacuation center kitchens and mobile kitchens. 8,229 individuals were reached.

2017 Tropical Storm Kai-Tak 
Tropical Storm Kai-Tak (known locally as Urduja) struck the Visayas region of Philippines in December 2017. The heavy rain and wind damaged numerous coastal villages and threatened locals whose livelihoods are dependent on farming and fishing. 43 deaths were reported in the aftermath.  

Mercy Relief worked with Disaster Response Center and disaster preparedness committee leaders from 2 villages and municipal youth members to procure food and prepared hot meals for individuals and children affected by the typhoon. A total of 1,900 meals were served to children and individuals.

2017 Rakhine Conflict Relief   
Ethnic conflict in the Rakhine state of Myanmar has displaced over 30,000 ethnic Muslims and minority groups and destroyed approximately 3,000 houses. Violence rose as security forces and armed groups were engaged in active conflict. The crackdown unleashed by the state forced people to flee their homes as the siege intensifies and movements of people are restricted.  

Partnering with Myanmar Heart Development Organization, Mercy Relief conducted 10 relief missions across 13 villages to ensure food security. A total of 2,200 relief packs were provided to the households in the Maungdaw and Buthidaung townships.

2017 Bangladesh Refugee Crisis   
Attacks launched by Arakhine Rohingya Salvation Army (ARSA) in Rakhine, Myanmar, in August 2017 have forced more than 607,000 refugees to flee to Bangladesh on foot. The sudden influx of refugees led to a dire shortage in supply of food, shelter, water in the camps and makeshift settlements at the border of Myanmar and Bangladesh.  

Working closely with the Singapore Armed Forces, Mercy Relief managed to bring essential supplies worth $270,000 to Bangladesh and deliver them to the troubled survivors. Tents, shelter kits, solar lamps and more were distributed in Cox’s Bazar Dignity kits containing shawls, sanitary napkins and soap were also prepared for women. The effort reached a sum of 20,859 people. Mercy Relief also partnered with Human Aid Bangladesh Foundation to operate a health care centre in Bulukhali Camp -9 to provide maternal and child healthcare services for the refugees. Additionally, Traditional Birth Attendant (TBA) training was conducted in Camp -16 to educate health volunteers on procedures to ensure safe delivery and transition to motherhood in the camp. The total number of beneficiaries is 23,345 people.

2017 South Asia Flood Relief   
A torrential monsoon blanketed Nepal, India, and Bangladesh in August 2017 and led to major flooding and large-scale landslides. 41 million people were affected across the 3 countries. The communities were hit hard as homes, livelihood, and major infrastructures like airports and railways were destroyed or damaged.  

Mercy Relief responded to the crisis by launching a multi-country relief mission. Food packs, hygiene kits, and bedding materials necessary to tide survivors through the tough period were distributed. In collaboration with Heart Beat and Rural Development Centre (RDC) in Nepal, Purvanchal Gramin Vikas Sansthan (PGVS) in India, and HEED Bangladesh, a total of 5,761 survivors were reached. Subsequently, Mercy Relief also distributed farming materials to farmers in Naogaon District, Bangladesh, to speed up the recovery process for agriculture production, benefitting 70 farmers and 45 families. The team also provided 115 families with housing materials to construct their transitional shelters.

2017 Sri Lankan Flood Relief   
The early arrival of the southwest monsoon in May 2017 shattered 15 districts in Sri Lanka and led to the deaths of 219 people. Strong winds and heavy rainfalls triggered severe flooding and landslides. Close to 80,000 houses were dismantled, affecting 229,235 families. 

Together with Sarvodaya Foundation, Mercy Relief distributed 710 emergency food and hygiene packs to the affected communities in Kalutara, Galle and Matara district, all of which reported to be the most severely affected areas. The mission benefitted 3,550 people in total.

2016 Typhoon Haima 
In October 2016, Typhoon Haima hit some areas of the Philippines and nearby countries, leading to 19 fatalities. In Cagayan province alone, between 50,000 and 60,000 hectares of rice fields were flattened and flooded by the typhoon, causing serious concerns about food security and livelihoods.

Mercy Relief distributed emergency food supplies and essentials such as rice, oil, dried foods and blankets as well as 100 water filtration kits (WateROAM) to communities who were affected by Typhoon Haima in the Philippines. In total, 3,750 beneficiaries were reached in the municipalities of Amulung and Rizal in the Cagayan region.

2016 Aceh earthquake 
A 6.5-magnitude earthquake has struck Aceh in 2016, which displaced more than 11,000 people, left 104 deceased and at least 1,200 injured.

Mercy Relief responded to the disaster by deploying a two-man disaster response team to assess the needs of the community on the ground and coordinate disaster relief efforts. Among other sources, funds amounting $46,570 were raised through the website Giving.sg specific for the Aceh Earthquake Relief and the team provided aid and assistance which include basic healthcare provision and improving community kitchens catering to mothers and children in Aceh.

The team also led a Maternal and Child Health programme to provide 217 pregnant, lactating mothers and their children with nutritional meals as well as health clinics. 266 mosquito nets were also distributed to the affected villagers to prevent the spread of disease

2016 Japan earthquake
Two earthquake struck Kumomoto in Japan in mid-April of magnitudes of 6.5 and 7.3, these damaged 140,000 homes and displaced 11,000 people. Mercy Relief was able to respond to this humanitarian crises with $333,000 in aid funding which was able to benefit 37,000 individuals. Of these people, 18,700 hot meals were distributed to survivors over only 47 days.

Staying true to its core values, considerable amounts of aid were put to not only providing hot meals but also to much longer-serving and beneficial projects such as healthcare services and medicine. Evacuation centers were built as well as reconstruction of facilities such as housing, sanitation and schools. Mercy Relief also supports the construction of 7 social welfare centers. 15,500 individuals benefited from these medical, healthcare and psychosocial services.

2015 Nepal earthquake
Mercy Relief responded to the April 2015 Nepal earthquake, which killed at least 8,000 people, and more than 18,000 people have been injured. Mercy Relief deployed a 2-man preliminary disaster to Kathmandu, Nepal within 48 hours of the disaster and provided shelter, food, medicine, hygiene kits and water for the survivors.

During the post-disaster phase, Mercy Relief managed to raise $750,000 to help victims of the Nepal earthquake, of which $60,000 went to support acute relief effort. It has also launched fundraising campaigns, collaborating with organizations like Qoo10 on an online fundraising campaign, raising over $30,000. And Singapore Civil Defence Force, where volunteers cycled for 10 hours on 6 water filtration bicycles to raise funds for the victims in Nepal.

Mercy Relief also undertook reconstruction projects to provide a secure roof for quake survivors and temporary structures to be used as a school before the onset of the monsoon. Using public donations, it put up 510 shelters, providing shelter to individuals during the monsoon season. The next phase focused on permanent shelter reconstruction after the monsoon passes. In total, about $1.5 million of funds were raised to provide acute relief and reconstruction efforts.

Up till 28 April 2015, the team has done 27 relief distribution and 8 medical missions, helping individuals living in the rural regions of Kathmandu and other areas of Nepal and about 20,000 beneficiaries.

2014 Gaza conflict 
The 2014 Israel-Gaza conflict, which started in 2006, was a military operation by Israel. It started on 8 July 2014, lasting for 49 days, ending on 26 August 2014. The Gaza conflict resulted in 1,748 deaths and 9,078 Palestinians injured. It left more than 273,000 Palestinians displaced, 1.8 million people affected, 138 schools and 26 health facilities damaged.

In light of the military operations, Mercy Relief worked with Palestinian Wefaq Association and Palestinian Red Cross Society to help victims of the operation. It has contributed $400,000 worth of aid, of which $250,000 was distributed as an initial tranche. It also provided $60,000 worth of food aid, $100,000 worth of medical supplies, and a fully equipped ambulance, which will be deployed by its Palestinian partner agency.

2013 Typhoon Haiyan 
In 2013, Typhoon Haiyan swept the Philippines in early November 2013. One of the deadliest typhoons in Philippines in modern history, it caused 6,300 in Philippines alone and affected 14.1 million people.

In the wake of the typhoon, Mercy Relief launched a public fundraising from 7 to 31 December, raising $1.16 million from public donations to help individuals affected by the typhoon. The donations were channelled to mainly funding health-care missions and rebuilding efforts. Besides fundraising, Mercy Relief focused on providing acute emergency relief and gathering relief supplies from neighbouring, less affected areas. It dispatched teams to provinces devastated by the typhoon, helping about 25,000 people.

2011 Japan earthquake and tsunami 
The 2011 Tōhoku earthquake and tsunami happened on 11 March 2011. It started as a 9.0 undersea earthquake, that resulted in a tsunami which caused 15, 893 deaths, 6,152 injured and 2,572 people missing.

Following the disaster, Mercy Relief raised $2.6 million for victims, where they spent on operations and logistics, buying essentials and radioactive protective suits for survivors. It camped out in disaster-stricken regions in Japan for 5 months, pumped $2.8 million to help victims of the disaster. This included distributing 5000 winter blankets in Ishinomaki, a city located in Miyagi.

Mercy Relief, with the help of a Japanese volunteer, implemented the Tohoku Livelihood and Recovery program, an 8-month program which trains individuals to operate heavy machinery. The program benefited 300 farming and fishing communities across Iwate, Miyagi and Fukushima. And following the program, 832 Japanese were trained to operate heavy machinery, allowing them to help in decontamination works, removing debris left behind by the earthquake.

2010 Pakistan flood

The 2010 Pakistan floods happened in late July due to heavy monsoon rains that affected the Indus River basin. As a result of the flood, about 20% of Pakistan's total land area was submerged. The floods killed close to 2000 people, and directly affected approximately 20 million people were affected.

In response to the flood, Mercy Relief sent disaster relief teams and has helped raise $509,000 to provide relief aid and supplies to the flood victims. It also distributed ultra-filtration systems, food and tents for residents. Realising a shortage of medical services, Mercy Relief partnered with SingHealth and South City Hospital in Pakistan, where a medical mission team was sent to aid residents living in that region.

2008 Sichuan earthquake

The 2008 Sichuan earthquake was an 8.0 magnitude earthquake, which happened on 12 May 2008. It killed 69,197 people and left 18,222 people missing.

Mercy Relief responded to the 2008 Sichuan earthquake, which killed almost 90,000 people and affected a population of 11 million. It was the first foreign group to deliver essentials such as toothpaste and milk powder amounting to $50,000 to Lushan, the southwestern part of Sichuan. Apart from helping the Lushan community, Mercy Relief also helped individuals in Baoxing, where they supported in the provision of relief supplies, worth $250,000.

Back home in Singapore, Mercy Relief have raised over $1.1 million. More than half of the amount were used for the reconstruction of 2 rural schools.

2004 Indian Ocean earthquake and tsunami 
The 2004 Indian Ocean earthquake, also known as the Sumatra-Andaman earthquake, happened on 26 December 2004 and resulted in a tsunami which killed 230,000 people in 14 countries.

Following the tsunami, Mercy Relief raised $1.1 million, spending on supplies for the victims. Apart from raising funds, Mercy Relief managed food relief packages, food and water donations. It also sent two teams to Sri Lanka and Aceh to help with post-disaster work. In Aceh, it spearheaded a S$2 million housing project, building proper housing for 900 victims of the tsunami, and donated fishing boats to the locals. Mercy Relief also took on a US$3 million project to rebuild the only hospital in Meulaboh, West Aceh that was struck by the tsunami, as well as other school and orphanage building projects.

Local outreach

Ground Zero – Run for Humanity 2015 
On 10 October 2015, Mercy Relief organized Singapore's first humanitarian-themed charity race in Singapore, Ground Zero, Run for Humanity. The run garnered 1,100 participants and saw some 500 participants carrying a 5 kg relief pack while completing a 5 km Relief Aid Challenge, mimicking the experiences of victims in natural disasters. Attendees of the event include Minister of Environment and Water Resources, Masagos Zulkifli.

Ground Zero – Run for Humanity 2016 
1,237 participants took part in the Ground Zero Run for Humanity 2016, which took place at Casuarina Grove, East Coast Park, on 14 August 2016. Held in observance of World Humanitarian Day, this run celebrated the indomitable human spirit of humanitarian workers by standing in solidarity with the survivors who have inspired humanitarian work around the world. A total of 2,700 kg worth of relief packs were carried in the 5km Relief Aid challenge.

Ground Zero – Run for Humanity 2017 
Mercy Relief celebrated its third edition of the Ground Zero Run on 13 August 2017 at Casuarina Grove, East Coast Park, with more than 30 partners, including official title sponsor The Hour Glass. Donated by The Food Bank Singapore, 3000kg of rice were carried by participants in the 5km Relief Aid Challenge and 1km Dash for Humanity to simulate the relief packs carried by survivors of natural disasters. These "relief packs" were then donated to Sion Christian Aftercare Service Centre, Bethel Community Service, and Migrant Workers Centre after the event. Attendees included Guest-of-Honour Ms Sim Ann, Senior Minister of State for Culture, Community and Youth & Trade and Industry.

Ground Zero – Carnival 2018 
Mercy Relief organised Singapore’s first humanitarian-themed family event, Ground Zero Carnival (GZC), on 22 and 23 September 2018 at Our Tampines Hub. Through a series of events that included Embark on a Survivor’s Journey, Glimpses From The Ground, and Mercy Relief Sustainable Marketplace, GZC engaged Singaporeans in a unique educational experience that took visitors on a journey of a post-disaster survivor. GZC also showcased the charity’s collective impact over the past decade. Attendees included Guest-of-Honour Mr Masagos Zulkifli, Minister for the Environment and Water Resources, who has played a key role in the formation of Mercy Relief.

Ground Zero Run Virtual Challenge 2020 
In light of the Covid-19 pandemic, Mercy Relief’s annual Ground Zero Run was held virtually in 2020. From 06-27 September 575 participants could decide where to run and whether to split up their chosen distance or complete it all at once. Similar to the Ground Zero Runs in previous years, runners were encouraged to simulate the experience of a survivor’s journey of collecting urgent supplies in the aftermath of a natural disaster by running with a 5kg weight in the form of rice pack, water bottles or training weights. In total, a sum of $270,000 was raised.

Gift Of Giving 2020 
Mercy Relief launched its first-ever "Gift of Giving" Campaign on 16 November 2020. "Gift of Giving" is a virtual fund-raising campaign inspired by the season of giving. The campaign explores the meaning of giving among its stakeholders and encourages the spirit of giving within the community.

References

2003 establishments in Singapore
Aid